"Sex, Pies and Idiot Scrapes" is the first episode of the twentieth season of the American animated television series The Simpsons. It originally aired on the Fox network in the United States on September 28, 2008. In the episode, Homer meets bail bondsman Lucky Jim and Wolf the Bounty Hunter after getting charged for being involved in a fight, and they convince him to become a bounty hunter. In a twisted turn of events, he becomes Ned Flanders' partner. Meanwhile, Marge unknowingly begins working at an erotic bakery.

The episode was written by Kevin Curran and directed by Lance Kramer. Julia Louis-Dreyfus returns as Snake's girlfriend Gloria for the third time. Robert Forster provides the voice of Lucky Jim, and Joe Mantegna returns as the recurring character Fat Tony in the episode.

"Sex, Pies and Idiot Scrapes" has received positive reviews from television critics. It was watched by 9.3 million viewers the night it aired.

Plot
An alcohol-free Springfield Saint Patrick's Day parade is interrupted by a brawl between the Nationalist Irish and the Unionist Northern Irish in which Homer participates. A group of hungry children steal Marge's picnic basket. She is saved by Patrick Farrelly, who gives the children a cabbage and returns the basket. Marge offers him a cupcake in gratitude, and Patrick immediately offers her a job at his bakery after eating it. At the bakery, Marge realizes that Patrick employed her at an erotic bakery after seeing Patty and Selma pick out a suggestively-shaped cake. Marge tries to quit, but Patrick says that there is nothing wrong with what he is doing, and that many of her friends have bought cakes from the store. Patrick informs Marge that she has a gift, and Marge agrees to stay.

Due to his involvement in the riot and his history of crime, Homer is arrested and his bail set incredibly high. Homer's bail bondsman Lucky Jim agrees to secure Homer's release from prison, as long as Homer does not skip his bail. Otherwise, he will have to deal with Wolf the Bounty Hunter, who quickly inspires Homer to become a bounty hunter himself. Homer's first mission involves pretending to sell condos on a street corner to criminals. Snake approaches Homer, who tries to take Snake down. Homer corners Snake in an alleyway, where Snake pulls out a pistol and fires a shot straight to Homer's head. Miraculously, Ned Flanders places a sheet of bulletproof glass in front of Homer, which deflects the shot. Ned attempts to convince Snake to come in quietly, unknowingly allowing Homer to sneak up behind Snake and capture him by asphyxiating him with a plastic bag. Giving Ned his cut of the bounty, Homer convinces him to partner up as a bounty hunting duo, and they successfully pursue several bail-jumpers. Homer spoils his family with gifts, chiefly evidence such as bullets or chemical equipment taken from meth labs. Marge is equally proud of her job, although after Homer innocuously considers ordering a birthday cake for Lisa from the erotic bakery and unwittingly eats several components for an order for Waylon Smithers, Marge confesses to the precise nature of her work.

That evening, Homer and Ned conduct a stakeout, hoping to take in Fat Tony. When he emerges next morning, Homer and Ned chase him around Springfield and eventually capture him by crashing their car into a subway car. Disgusted by Homer's lawless capture, Ned angrily quits and vows to leave the bounty-hunting business. When Ned learns from Jim that Homer has skipped his bail while being too distracted with his new job, he fears for Homer's sake and Jim's threats of sending a number of amoral and sociopathic bounty hunters after Homer, so Ned decides to arrest Homer by himself. Ned ambushes Homer as he arrives home and a long parkour chase ensues, ending with the two on a beam suspended high over the ground. Homer jumps onto another beam, but Ned fails to land on it, gripping onto the edge of the beam. He begs Homer for help, which causes Homer to remember all the good times he and Ned had together; Homer finally helps Ned, but ends up tumbling over the edge of the beam himself, causing them both to land in a pool of wet cement – which unfortunately sets before they can get out. Chief Wiggum arrests Homer, who is sentenced to a short stay in jail. On the last night of his sentence, while Sideshow Bob escapes from the Springfield Penitentiary, Homer receives a cake from Marge to "help get him through his sentence". He opens it to find a regular pink and white frosted sheet cake that simply says "to the love of my life".

Production
"Sex, Pies and Idiot Scrapes" was written by Kevin Curran and directed by Lance Kramer.

Cultural references
The episode title is an allusion to Steven Soderbergh's 1989 directorial debut Sex, Lies, and Videotape. Robert Forster guest stars as bail bondsman Lucky Jim in the episode, the same job his character held in the 1997 film Jackie Brown. The bail bondsman Wolf is a parody of Duane "Dog" Chapman, the star of the series Dog the Bounty Hunter, while one of the bounty hunters lining up to chase Homer down, before Ned takes the job, is Rose McGowan's character Cherry Darling from Robert Rodriguez's 2007 film Planet Terror. In the opening St. Patrick's Day brawl, Marvel Comics characters The Thing and The Incredible Hulk have cameos, while before that Bart notes that he misses the IRA, a reference to the ending of their armed campaign in 2005. When Homer reminisces about the good times he and Ned had, one clip shows the two of them in a Batman-esque fight scene. The episode's couch gag parodies The Empire Strikes Back, with Boba Fett appearing and carrying away the family frozen in carbonite as he had done to Han Solo. When Homer and Ned are stuck in the wet concrete, Ned talks to Homer about the Bible, referencing a scene in Waiting for Godot.

The episode features several musical references. Homer and Ned's song "Kindly Deeds Done For Free" is a parody of "Dirty Deeds Done Dirt Cheap" by AC/DC. Lisa sings "Too Ra Loo Ra Loo Ral" to calm the fighting Irish, the Eddy Grant song "Electric Avenue" accompanies the montage of Homer and Ned hunting criminals.

The highly choreographed sequence where Ned chases Homer through a construction site is a reference to the 2006 James Bond film Casino Royale. Homer and Ned chasing the subway is a reference to The French Connection.

Reception
The episode originally aired on the Fox network in the United States on September 28, 2008 from 8:00-8:30p.m. It was watched by 9.3 million people, making it the most-watched Fox cartoon of the night, beating Family Guy, which was second with 9.2 million viewers. At the time, it was the lowest rated season premiere of The Simpsons on record. It was surpassed by the season 21 premiere episode, "Homer the Whopper", which was viewed in 8.31 million homes.

Robert Canning of IGN called it a "fun, if standard, start to Season 20". In the end, he gave a final rating of 7.2/10. Joel Brown of "MeeVee" gave the episode a B−. Justin Gagnon of The Daily Collegian called the episode "worthwhile viewing for both big fans and occasional watchers and proves that even after 20 seasons the show still can dish up some fresh laughs." Screen Rant called it the best episode of the 20th season.

On March 17, 2009 (Saint Patrick's Day), the episode aired alongside episode 14 of season 20, "In the Name of the Grandfather", on Sky One. "In the Name of the Grandfather" was the first episode of The Simpsons to premiere in Europe before the United States.

Controversy
The episode stirred controversy in Northern Ireland over the brawl that occurred in the opening act of the episode. The brawl, between Irish and Northern Irish people, included Bart's line "Where are the IRA when you need them?" Gregory Campbell, a Northern Irish MP for East Londonderry in Northern Ireland said "The Simpsons is a humorous cartoon but the context of using a line like that about an organisation which caused so much death will lead people to have very mixed views, some people may take it as a light-hearted reference, while others who were affected by the real life violence of the IRA and are still suffering with that legacy, will not."

References

Bibliography

External links

The Simpsons (season 20) episodes
2008 American television episodes
Animation controversies in television
Television controversies in the United Kingdom
Television controversies in Ireland
Controversies in Northern Ireland